Vincent is a census-designated place in southern Barlow Township, Washington County, Ohio, United States. It has a post office with the ZIP code 45784. It lies along State Route 339 near Tupper Creek, a subsidiary of the Little Hocking River, which in turn meets the Ohio River at Little Hocking to the south.

History
Vincent had its start when the Marietta & Cincinnati Railroad was extended to that point. The community was founded as Vincents Station in 1853 by Henry Earle Vincent, and named for him. A post office called Vincent has been in operation since 1857.

Education
Warren High School and Warren Middle School serve local students.

References

Unincorporated communities in Washington County, Ohio
1853 establishments in Ohio
Populated places established in 1853
Unincorporated communities in Ohio